Pandanus brookei a species of plant in the family Pandanaceae. It is native to Queensland. Sometimes called screw pine, this tree can reach 7-10 meters tall.

References

Flora of Queensland
brookei
Taxa named by Ugolino Martelli